Chang'an Ford 2015 Chinese FA Super Cup (Chinese: 长安福特2015中国足球协会超级杯) was the 13th Chinese FA Super Cup. The match was sponsored by Changan Ford Mazda Automobile Co., Ltd. and played at Yellow Dragon Sports Center on 14 February 2015, contested by Super League winners Guangzhou Evergrande Taobao and FA Cup winners Shandong Luneng Taishan. Shandong Luneng Taishan defeated Guangzhou Evergrande 5–3 in the penalty shoot-out, thus winning their first Chinese FA Super Cup title, and Guangzhou lost for three consecutive years.

Match

Details

References

External links
 

FA Super Cup
2015
Guangzhou F.C. matches
Association football penalty shoot-outs